Speed climbing competitions at the 2017 IFSC Climbing World Cup were being held at seven stops. The winners were awarded trophies, and the best three finishers received medals.

At the World Cup in Nanjing, Reza Alipour of Iran and Russia's Iuliia Kaplina set world records on their way to the men's and women's speed titles of 5.48 and 7.38 seconds respectively.

At the end of the season an overall ranking was determined based upon points, which athletes were awarded for finishing in the top 30 of each individual event. Vladislav Deulin won the men's seasonal title, Anouck Jaubert won the women's seasonal title, and Russian Federation won the national team title.

Overall Ranking 
An overall ranking was determined based upon points, which athletes were awarded for finishing in the top 30 of each individual event.

Men 
6 best competition results were counted (not counting points in brackets) for IFSC Climbing World Cup 2017. Vladislav Deulin won.

Women 
6 best competition results were counted (not counting points in brackets) for IFSC Climbing World Cup 2017. Anouck Jaubert won.

National Teams 
For National Team Ranking, 3 best results per competition and category were counted (not counting results in brackets). Russian Federation won.

Chongqing, China (22–23 April)

Men 
42 athletes attended the World Cup in Chongqing. Vladislav Deulin won.

Women 
20 athletes attended the World Cup in Chongqing. Iuliia Kaplina won.

Nanjing, China (29–30 April)

Men 
40 athletes attended the World Cup in Nanjing. Reza Alipour won and set a new speed world record of 5.48 seconds in the semifinal race against Bassa Mawem of France, who finished fourth. The previous world record for men's 15-meter speed wall was set at 5.60 seconds by Danyil Boldyrev at the IFSC World Championships in 2014.

Women 
22 athletes attended the World Cup in Nanjing. Iuliia Kaplina won and set a new world record of 7.38, beating her time of 7.46 from last week in Chongqing.

Villars, Switzerland (7–8 July)

Men 
40 athletes attended the World Cup in Villars. Reza Alipour won.

Women 
35 athletes attended the World Cup in Villars. Anouck Jaubert won.

Arco, Italy (25–26 August)

Men 
50 athletes attended the World Cup in Arco. Vladislav Deulin won.

Women 
45 athletes attended the World Cup in Arco. Anouck Jaubert won.

Edinburgh, United Kingdom (23–24 September)

Men 
29 athletes attended the World Cup in Edinburgh. Ludovico Fossali won.

Women 
24 athletes attended the World Cup in Edinburgh. Anouck Jaubert won.

Wujiang, China (7–8 October)

Men 
38 athletes attended the World Cup in Wujiang. Aleksandr Shikov won.

Women 
27 athletes attended the World Cup in Wujiang. Iuliia Kaplina won.

Xiamen, China (14–15 October)

Men 
34 athletes attended the World Cup in Xiamen. Vladislav Deulin won.

Women 
24 athletes attended the World Cup in Xiamen. Anouck Jaubert won.

References 

IFSC Climbing World Cup
2017 in sport climbing